The H–I or H–1 was a Japanese liquid-fuelled carrier rocket, consisting of a licence-produced American first stage and set of booster rockets, and all-Japanese upper stages. The H in the name represented the use of liquid hydrogen fuel in the second stage. It was launched nine times between 1986 and 1992. It replaced the N-II, and was subsequently replaced by the H-II, which used the same upper stages with a Japanese first stage.

The first stage of the H–I was a licence-built version of the Thor-ELT, which was originally constructed for the US Delta 1000 rocket. The stage had already been produced under licence in Japan for the N-I and N-II rockets. The second stage was entirely Japanese, using an LE-5 engine, the first rocket engine in Japan to use a cryogenic fuel. On launches to Geosynchronous transfer orbits, a Nissan–built UM-69A solid motor was used as a third stage. Depending on the mass of the payload, either six or nine US Castor 2 SRMs were used as booster rockets.

Launch history

When the H–1 was announced in 1986, company representative Tsuguo Tatakawe clarified that it would only be used to launch indigenous (i.e. Japanese) payloads, that only two launches per year could be mounted, and that the launch window consisted of a four-month period in which Japanese fishing fleets were not active (the falling launch boosters may damage fishing nets in the ocean waters).

See also
Delta rocket
H-II
H-IIA
PGM-17 Thor
 Comparison of orbital launchers families
 Comparison of orbital launch systems

References

Mitsubishi Heavy Industries space launch vehicles
Vehicles introduced in 1986
Thor (rocket family)
Japan–United States relations